Michael Benabib is an American portrait photographer, known for his portraits of David Bowie, Tupac Shakur, Sean Combs, and Keith Richards among others. Notable portrait photography of public figures include Bill Clinton, Alan Dershowitz and Loretta Lynch. His work has appeared in publications including Vanity Fair, Vogue, GQ, Rolling Stone, Vibe, ESPN magazine, The Wall Street Journal, The New York Times, NPR and Newsweek. His work was included to photography collections on display by The Smithsonian and MoMa.

Hip-hop photography 
In the 1980s, Michael freelanced with Rush Management and Def Jam Records; his photography of musicians include Rakim, LL Cool J, Public Enemy, DJ Jazzy Jeff & The Fresh Prince, among many others.

In 2007, Watson-Guptill Publications and Billboards Books published “In Ya Grill: The Faces Of Hip-Hop” the hip-hop photography of Michael Benabib and text by Bill Adler.

Career 
In 1995, his editorial photography assignments for magazines include The New York Times Magazine, Newsweek, Rolling Stone, Adweek, Forbes, ESPN Magazine, and Bloomberg Markets Magazine.

In 1997, his editorial magazine photography led to advertising assignments for brands including Heineken, Nissan, Sprite, Lugz, PETA and Planned Parenthood.

In the early 2000s, his assignments include Forbes Life Magazine and Fortune 500 companies such as American Express, CitiBank and Pfizer, among others.

Exhibitions 
In 2003, The Eyejammie Fine Arts Gallery founded by Bill Adler, largely devoted to hip-hop photography, curated a one-man show showcasing the work of photographer Michael Benabib. In September 2015, the Eyejammie Photo Collection was acquired by the Smithsonian Institution's National Museum of African-American History and Culture.

In 2017, the Museum of Modern Art (MoMa) exhibition titled “Is Fashion Modern?” includes his photography of Tupac Shakur.

In 2017, Smithsonian Institution's National Museum of African-American History and Culture exhibition titled “More Than A Picture” includes his photography acquired from the Eyejammie Photo Collection.

In 2018, The Smithsonian exhibition titled “Represent” includes his hip-hop photography of MC Lyte, Tupac Shakur, and Mary J. Blige. This exhibition showcases different photographs than those displayed at The Smithsonian's exhibition in 2017.

In June 2018, Bond Street Print Shop photography exhibition fundraiser to benefit Southern Poverty Law Center including print sales of his portrait photography.

In 2019, The Annenberg Space For Photography in Culver City, California hosted an exhibit entitled Contact High: A Visual History of Hip Hop, based upon the contents of the book in association with the museum's 10th anniversary. The exhibit included his photography.

In 2020, Contact High: A Visual History of Hip-Hop was exhibited at the International Center of Photography in New York as part of the inauguration of the ICP's new location at 79 Essex Street on Manhattan's Lower East Side.

Books 

 In Ya Grill: The Faces of Hip Hop. The hip-hop photography of Michael Benabib. Billboard Books. 2007. .

References

Citations

Books 

 Bill Adler; Dan Charnas (2011). Def Jam Recordings: The First 25 Years of the Last Great Record Label. Random House Incorporated. .
 Paola Antonelli; Michelle Millar Fisher (5 October 2017). Items - Is Fashion Modern?. Moma. .
 Tommy Hilfiger; David A. Keeps (1997). All-American: A Style Book. Universe Pub. .

General References 

 Sussex Publishers, LLC (1996-06). Spy. Sussex Publishers, LLC. pp. 32, 33, 34, 35, 70. ISSN 08901759 
 Elinor Lipman (2017-02-14). On Turpentine Lane. Houghton Mifflin Harcourt. pp. cover photo. .
 Editors of Entertainment Weekly (2015-10-06). The Must List: Ranking the Best in 25 Years of Pop Culture. Liberty Street. p. 560. .
 Minya Oh; Andrea Duncan Mao (2005-08-10). Bling Bling: Hip Hop's Crown Jewels. Wenner Books. p. 140. .
 Reggie Osse; Gabriel Tolliver (2006-10-31). Bling: The Hip-Hop Jewelry Book. Bloomsbury USA.
 Cey Adams; Bill Adler (2008-10-14). DEFinition: The Art and Design of Hip-Hop. HarperCollins. .
 Black Enterprise. E.G. Graves Publishing Company. 1999–12. p. 124. 
 Jay-Z (2010-12-07). Decoded (Enhanced Edition). Random House Publishing Group. p. 349. .
 Michael W. Small (1992). Break it Down: The Inside Story from the New Leaders of Rap. Carol Pub. p. 223. .
 Que pasa. D.S. Magazines, Incorporated. 1988. p. 5.
 Oneworld. New Image Media, Incorporated. 2002. p. 34.
 Linda Saylor-Marchant (1992). Hammer: 2 Legit 2 Quit. Dillon Press. p. 4. .
 Andre Stenson; Cloe Anderson; Dan Levine (2006-03). Avant-Guide New York City: Insiders' Guide to Progressive Culture. Empire Press. .
 S. E. Cupp (2010-04-27). Losing Our Religion: The Liberal Media's Attack on Christianity. Simon and Schuster. pp. cover photo. .
 Brian J. Robb (2002). Brad Pitt: The Rise to Stardom. Plexus. pp. cover photo. .
 Alonzo Westbrook (2002-10-15). Hip Hoptionary TM: The Dictionary of Hip Hop Terminology. Crown/Archetype. .
 Lili Anolik (2019-01-08). Hollywood's Eve: Eve Babitz and the Secret History of L.A. Scribner. pp. Author photo. .
 Ronin Ro (2009-10-13). Raising Hell: The Reign, Ruin, and Redemption of Run-D.M.C. and Jam Master Jay. HarperCollins. .
 S. E. Cupp; Brett Joshpe (2009-12-01). Why You're Wrong About the Right: Behind the Myths: The Surprising Truth About Conservatives. Simon and Schuster. .
 Stephen J. Dubner (2009-10-13). Confessions of a Hero-Worshiper. HarperCollins. .
 Lauren Groveman (2001–08). Lauren Groveman's Kitchen: Nurturing Food for Family of Friends. Chronicle Books. pp. Author photo. .
 Futures for the Class of ... Scholastic, Incorporated. 1995.
 Hip-hop Connection. Popular Publications. 2007. p. 226.
 Anne M. Raso (1992-08-01). Kris Kross Krazy: A Biography. Random House. p. 56. .
 Derek Winnert (1996). Barbra Streisand. Random House Value Pub. p. 4. .
 Television Guide. Triangle Publications. 1991. p. 3.
 People. Time. 2005. p. 80.
 Jeff Chang (2007-04-01). Can't Stop Won't Stop: A History of the Hip-Hop Generation. St. Martin's Press. p. 528. .
 James P. Othmer (2011-03-11). The Futurist. Doubleday Canada. .

External links 
 http://michaelbenabib.com/
 https://www.executivephotosnyc.com/

Living people
American portrait photographers
Year of birth missing (living people)